Liancheng may refer to:

Liancheng County (连城县), Longyan, Fujian
Liancheng National Nature Reserve (连城国家级自然保护区), in the Yellow River Basin in Gansu
Liancheng, Lianshui County (涟城镇), town in Lianshui County, Jiangsu
Liancheng, Lishui (联城镇), town in Liandu District, Lishui, Zhejiang
Shanghai Liancheng (上海联城足球俱乐部), football club that competes in the Chinese Super League

See also 
Liaocheng, prefecture-level city in Shandong province